Seshote is a community council located in the Leribe District of Lesotho. Its population in 2006 was 9,359.

Villages
The community of Seshote includes the villages of Ha Chelane, Ha Kanono, Ha Khenene, Ha Kokoana, Ha Leaooa, Ha Lelingoana, Ha Lesenya (Ha Seshote), Ha Maieane, Ha Majela, Ha Makopela, Ha Mali, Ha Matete, Ha Mathabela, Ha Mpeako, Ha Mpeli, Ha Nang, Ha Nkaobee, Ha Nkunye, Ha Ntsooa, Ha Palama, Ha Ralebese, Ha Ramanemane, Ha Ramoji, Ha Seemane, Ha Sehloho (Ha Theko), Ha Sekereu (Bochabela), Ha Sekutlu, Ha Theko, Ha Tšehla, Khokhobe, Lihlabeng (Ha Theko), Linyokong, Mahateng, Mapeleng, Mashaleng (Ha Seshote), Ntširele, Patuoe, Phukheng, Seloloana (Khopung) and Thepung (Ha Maieane).

References

External links
 Google map of community villages

Populated places in Leribe District